All Seasons Arena is a multipurpose indoor venue in the north central United States, on the North Dakota State Fairgrounds in Minot, North Dakota. It has a seating capacity of 3,900.

The venue hosted a taping of UWF Fury Hour in July 1993.

References

Indoor ice hockey venues in the United States
College ice hockey venues in the United States
Indoor arenas in North Dakota
Sports venues in North Dakota
Minot State University
Sports venues in Minot, North Dakota